This is a list of Finance Ministers of Denmark since 1848. Denmark's first unified Finance Ministry was established in that year.

List of Finance ministers (1848-present)

Minister for Finance  under Frederick VII (1848–1863)

Minister for Finance under Christian IX (1863–1906)

Minister for Finance under Frederik VIII (1906–1912)

Minister for Finance under Christian X (1912–1947)

! colspan=8| 29 August 1943 – 5 May 1945

Minister for Finance under Frederik IX (1947–1972)

Minister for Finance under Margrethe II (1972–present)

Notes

Sources
The Danish Finance Ministry
danmark.dk - regarding the minister that died in office
Lists of Danish governments since 1848
Skou, Kaare R. (2005). Dansk politik A-Å . Aschehoug. .

Finance Ministers